The Kra languages (also known as the Geyang or Kadai languages) are a branch of the Kra–Dai language family spoken in southern China (Guizhou, Guangxi, Yunnan) and in northern Vietnam (Hà Giang Province).

Names
The name Kra comes from the word C "human" as reconstructed by Ostapirat (2000), which appears in various Kra languages as kra, ka, fa or ha. Benedict (1942) used the term Kadai for the Kra and Hlai languages grouped together and the term Kra-Dai is proposed by Ostapirat (2000).

The Kra branch was first identified as a unified group of languages by Liang (1990), who called it the Geyang 仡央 languages. Geyang 仡央 is a portmanteau of the first syllable of Ge- in Gelao and the last syllable of -yang in Buyang. The name Kra was proposed by Ostapirat (2000) and is the term usually used by scholars outside China, whereas Geyang is the name currently used in China.

Significance
Several Kra languages have regionally unusual consonant clusters and sesquisyllabic or disyllabic words, whereas other Kra–Dai languages tend to have only have single syllables. The disyllables in Buyang have been used by Sagart (2004) to support the view that the Kra-Dai languages are a subgroup within the Austronesian family. Unlike the Tai and Kam–Sui languages, most Kra languages, including Gelao and Buyang, have preserved the proto-Kra–Dai numerical systems. The only other Kra–Dai branch that preserves this is Hlai. Most other Kra–Dai languages adopted Chinese numerals over 1000 years ago.

As noted by Jerold A. Edmondson, the Kra languages contain words in metalworking, handicrafts and agriculture that are not attested in any other Kra–Dai language. This suggests that the Kra peoples may have developed or borrowed many technological innovations independently of the Tai and Kam-Sui peoples.

Reconstruction

The Proto-Kra language has been reconstructed by Weera Ostapirat (2000).

Classification
Morphological similarities suggest the Kra languages are closest to the Kam–Sui branch of the family. There are about a dozen Kra languages, depending on how languages and dialects are defined. Gelao, with about 8,000 speakers in China out of an ethnic population of approximately 500,000, and consists of at least four mutually unintelligible language varieties, including Telue (White Gelao), Hagei (Blue or Green Gelao), Vandu (Red Gelao), A'ou (Red Gelao), and Qau (Chinese Gelao).

Ostapirat (2000)
The internal classification below is from Weera Ostapirat (2000), who splits the Kra branch into the Eastern and Western branches.

According to Jerold Edmondson (2002), Laha is too conservative to be in Western Kra, considered it to constitute a branch of its own. However, Edmondson (2011) later reversed his position, considering Laha to be more closely related to Paha.

Ethnologue mistakenly includes the Hlai language Cun of Hainan in Kra; this is not supported by either Ostapirat or Edmondson.

Hsiu (2014)
Hsiu's (2014) classification of the Kra languages, based on computational phylogenetic analysis as well as Edmondson's (2011) earlier analysis of Kra, is given below, as cited in Norquest (2021).

Kra
Northern Kra
Lachi
Gelao
Red Gelao
Vandu
A'ou
Core Gelao
Dongkou Gelao
White Gelao (Telue)
Central Gelao: Hagei, Qau
Southern Kra
Guangxi Buyang (Yalhong)
Laha, Paha
Qabiao
Yunnan Buyang: Ecun, Langjia, Nung Ven

Substrata
Andrew Hsiu (2013, 2017) reports that Hezhang Buyi, a divergent, moribund Northern Tai language spoken by 5 people in Dazhai 大寨, Fuchu Township 辅处乡, Hezhang County 赫章县, Guizhou, China, has a Kra substratum.

Maza, a Lolo–Burmese language spoken in Mengmei 孟梅, Funing County, Yunnan, is also notable for having a Qabiao substratum (Hsiu 2014:68-69).

According to Li Jinfang (1999), the Yang Zhuang people of southwestern Guangxi may have been Kra speakers who had switched to Zhuang.

Demographics
The Kra languages have a total of about 22,000 speakers. In Vietnam, officially recognized Kra peoples are the Cờ Lao, La Chí, La Ha and Pu Péo. In China, only the Gelao (Cờ Lao) have official status. The other Kra peoples are variously classified as Zhuang, Buyi, Yi, and Han.

Within China, "hotspots" for Kra languages include most of western Guizhou, the prefecture-level city of Baise in western Guangxi, Wenshan Zhuang and Miao Autonomous Prefecture in southeastern Yunnan, as well as Hà Giang Province in northern Vietnam. This distribution runs along a northeast-southwest geographic vector, forming what Jerold A. Edmondson calls a "language corridor."

Multilingualism is common among Kra language speakers. For example, many Buyang can also speak Zhuang.

Western
Lachi (拉基, La Chí) – 10,300 (7,863 in Vietnam in 1990; 2,500 in Maguan County, Yunnan, China in 1995)
Gelao (仡佬, Cờ Lao) – 7,900 (spoken in Guizhou, Longlin Various Nationalities Autonomous County in Guangxi, and northern Vietnam)
Laha (拉哈, La Ha) – 1,400 (officially recognized in Vietnam; most divergent western Kra language)
Eastern
Buyang 布央 dialect cluster – 2,000
Paha 巴哈 (considered a separate language by Ostapirat; spoken in Yangliancun 央连村, Diyu Township, Guangnan County 广南县, Yunnan)
Langjia 郎架 (spoken in Langjia, Funing County, Yunnan along the Guangxi border)
Ecun 峨村 (spoken in Ecun, Funing County, Yunnan along the Guangxi border)
Yalang 雅郎 (Yalhong; spoken in Rongtun 荣屯, Napo County, Guangxi)
Qabiao (Pubiao 普标, Pu Péo) – 700
En (Nùng Vên; spoken in northern Vietnam) – 250

Numerals

Notes

Further reading
Ostapirat, Weera (2000). "Proto-Kra". Linguistics of the Tibeto-Burman Area 23 (1): 1-251
Edmondson, Jerold A. (2002). The Laha language and its position in Proto-Kra.
Sagart, Laurent. (2004) The higher phylogeny of Austronesian and the position of Tai-Kadai. Oceanic Linguistics 43,2: 411-444.

External links
Kra words lists from the Austronesian Basic Vocabulary Database
Proto-Kra reconstructions from the Austronesian Basic Vocabulary Database
Database of basic words in various Kra languages at Starling